The Pittock House also known as Lakeside and the Leadbetter House is a historic house located in Camas, Washington, United States. It was listed on the National Register of Historic Places on July 3, 1979.

Description and history
Henry L. Pittock had the house built for his son and daughter–in–law Frederick and Bertha Leadbetter Pittock when they married in 1902.

Modern times
In 2013 a group of 11 property owners in the north shore area of Lacamas Lake were in the process of moving a development proposal that included preservation of the Pittock House and another property through the county government. The group included Pittock heirs.

See also
 National Register of Historic Places listings in Clark County, Washington

References

External links
 
 

Houses completed in 1902
Houses in Clark County, Washington
Houses on the National Register of Historic Places in Washington (state)
National Register of Historic Places in Clark County, Washington
Queen Anne architecture in Washington (state)
Camas, Washington